Damon Run is a  long 2nd order tributary to Brokenstraw Creek.  It is classed as a cold-water fishery by the Pennsylvania Fish and Boat Commission.

Course
Damon Run rises on the divide between it and Prosser Run in Warren County, Pennsylvania about 1 mile southeast of Baker Hill and flows southeast to meet Brokenstraw Creek about 1.5 miles northwest of Spring Creek, Pennsylvania.

Watershed
Damon Run drains  of the Pennsylvania High Plateau province and the northwestern glaciated plateau and is underlaid by the Venango Formation. The watershed receives an average of 45.8 in/year of precipitation and has a wetness index of 393.52.  The watershed is about 62% forested.

See also 
 List of rivers of Pennsylvania

References

Rivers of Pennsylvania
Tributaries of the Allegheny River
Rivers of Warren County, Pennsylvania